The Lives of Dutch painters and paintresses, or De levens-beschryvingen der Nederlandsche konst-schilders en konst-schilderessen, as it was originally known in Dutch, is a series of artist biographies with engraved portraits written by the 18th-century painter Jacob Campo Weyerman. It was published in four volumes as a sequel to Arnold Houbraken's own list of biographies known as the Schouburgh. The first volume appeared in 1729, and the last volume was published in 1769. This work is considered to be a very important source of information on 17th-century artists of the Netherlands, specifically those artists who worked in The Hague and in London.

Volume I
The engraved portraits included as illustrations in Volume I are below, followed by the artists listed in order of appearance in the text. The illustrations are all copied from Houbraken.

 Hubert van Eyck, p 179
 Jan van Eyck, p 179
 Marguérite van Eyk, p 180
 Desiderius Erasmus, p 194
 David Joris, p 199
 Cornelis Anthonisz., p 201
 Jan de Hoey, p 202
 Bernard van Orley, p 203
 Hans Jordaens, p 204
 Adriaen Pietersz Crabeth, p 205
 Dirk Crabeth, p 205
 Wouter Crabeth I, p 205
 Cornelis IJsbrantsz Cussens, p 210
 Willem Thibaut, p 210
 Laurens van Kool, p 211
 Jacob Caan, p 212
 Jan Damesz de Veth, p 212
 Govert Hendriksz, p 212
 Cornelis van Haarlem, p 212
 Gerard van der Kuijl, p 212
 Jan Dirksz Lonck, p 212
 Aart Verhaast, p 212
 Dirk de Vrije, p 212
 Adriaen van der Spelt, p 213
 Hans von Aachen, p 214
 Otto van Veen, p 215
 Jan Snellinck, p 219
 Cornelia van Veen, p 219
 Gertruyde van Veen, Hague, p 219
 Jacob van Swanenburgh, p 221
 Isaac van Swanenburg, p 221
 Claes Isaacsz Swanenburg, p 222
 Willem Isaacsz Swanenburg, p 222
 Adam van Noort, p 222
 Adriaen van Nieulandt the younger, p 223
 Jan de Wael I, p 223
 Abraham Bloemaert, p 224
 Adriaan Bloemaert, p 227
 Hendrick Bloemaert, p 227
 Cornelis Bloemaert, p 228
 Tobias Verhaecht, p 229
 Michiel Jansz. van Mierevelt, p 230
 Pieter Dircksz Cluyt, p 234
 Klaudius Kornelisze, p 234
 Pieter van Mierevelt, p 234
 Pieter Geeritsz. Montfoort, p 234
 Paulus Moreelse, p 234
 Jan Woutersz van Cuyck, p 236
 Sebastian Vrancx, p 238
 Adam Elsheimer, p 240
 Hendrick Goudt, p 246
 Lucas Franchoys the Elder, p 247
 Roelant Savery, p 248
 Jan Baptist Biset, p 250
 Aart Jansz Druyvesteyn, p 251
 Adam Willaerts, p 251
 Willem Jacobsz Delff, p 252
 Peter Paul Rubens, p 253
 Jan Wildens, p 282
 Peter Snayers, p 295
 Anthony van Dyck, p 296
 Erasmus Quellinus II, p 310
 Pieter Soutman, p 316
 Cornelis Schut, p 317
 Jan van den Hoecke, p 318
 Samuel Hoffmann, p 318
 Maarten Pepyn, p 319
 Frans Wouters, p 319
 Abraham van Diepenbeeck, p 320
 Abraham Janssens, p 322
 Theodoor van Thulden, p 322
 Theodoor Rombouts, p 325
 Caspar de Crayer, p 327
 Dirk Rafaelsz Camphuysen, p 329
 Cornelius van Poelenburgh, p 333
 Jan van der Lijs, p 334
 Daniel Vertangen, p 334
 François Verwilt, p 334
 Alexander Keirincx, p 335
 Warnard van Rijsen, p 335
 Joris van Schooten, p 335
 Willem van Steenree, p 335
 Jacob Ernst Thomann von Hagelstein, p 336
 Pieter Feddes van Harlingen, p 337
 Hendrick ter Brugghen, p 337
 Pieter van Bronckhorst, p 339
 Adriaen van de Venne, p 340
 Johannes van der Beeck, p 341
 Daniel Seghers, p 343
 Jan Brueghel the Younger, p 346
 Hendrick van Balen, p 349
 Frans Snyders, p 350
 Frans Hals, p 352
 Adriaan van Stalbemt, p 352
 Dirck Hals, p 355
 Deodat del Monte, p 357
 Pieter Lastman, p 358
 Hendrick van der Burgh, p 362
 David Teniers the Elder, p 362
 Wenceslas Cobergher, p 363
 David Bailly, p 369
 Jacob Vosmaer, p 369
 Pieter de Valck, p 371
 Willem van der Vliet, p 372
 Willem van Nieulandt II, p 373
 Christiaen Jansz van Bieselingen, p 374
 Adriaen Brouwer, p 375
 Adriaen Cornelisz van Linschoten, p 375
 Lucas de Wael, p 376
 Wybrand de Geest, p 377
 Jacob Potma, p 378
 Gerard van Honthorst, p 379
 Adriaen de Bie, p 380
 Peter Snayers, p 380
 Cornelis de Wael, p 381
 Jacob Jordaens, p 382
 Dirk van Hoogstraten, p 386
 Lucas van Uden, p 386
 Jacob Franquart, p 389
 Anna Francisca de Bruyns, p 391
 Leonaert Bramer, p 392
 Jan van Goyen, p 393
 Pieter de Neyn, p 396
 Roelant Roghman, p 397
 Salomon de Bray, p 398
 Adriaen van Utrecht, p 400
 Wouter Crabeth I, p 401
 Huybrecht Jacobsz Grimani, p 401
 Johann Liss, p 402
 Jan Davidsz. de Heem, p 407

Volume II
The engraved portraits included as illustrations in Volume II are below, followed by the artists listed in order of appearance in the text. The illustrations are all copied from Houbraken.

 Jan Porcellis, p 1
 Jacob Pynas, p 2
 Jan Pynas, p 2
 Pieter de Molijn, p 3
 Werner van den Valckert, p 3
 Remigius van Rheni, p 4
 Lodewijk de Vadder, p 4
 Lucas Achtschellinck, p 5
 Andries van Eertvelt, p 5
 Martin Ryckaert, p 5
 Gillis Backereel, p 6
 Willem Backereel, p 6
 Jacob van Es, p 6
 Jan Wildens, p 7
 Jacob de Geest, p 8
 Pieter van de Plas, p 8
 Dirck van Baburen, p 9
 Gerardt Bartels, p 9
 Pieter Neeffs I, p 9
 Jacob van der Laemen, p 10
 Hendrick de Clerck, p 12
 Antoine Sallaert, p 12
 Denis van Alsloot, p 13
 Friedrich Brentel, p 13
 Abraham de Bruyn, p 13
 Justus van Egmont, p 13
 David de Haan, p 13
 Jacob van der Heyden, p 13
 Johann Hulsman, p 13
 Willem Mahue, p 13
 Abraham Matthijs, p 13
 Gillis van Tilborch, p 13
 Philippe de Champaigne, p 14
 Evert van Aelst, p 17
 Willem van Aelst, p 17
 Johannes van Bronckhorst, p 19
 Nikolaus Knüpfer, p 21
 Jan Cossiers, p 23
 Simon de Vos, p 23
 Pieter Jansz van Asch, p 24
 Jan van Bijlert, p 24
 Christiaen van Couwenbergh, p 24
 Daniel van Heil, p 25
 Jacob Gerritsz. Cuyp, p 25
 Aelbert Cuyp, p 26
 Peter Franchoys, p 27
 Luigi Primo, p 27
 Luigi Primo, p 27
 Peter Danckerts de Rij, p 27
 Rembrandt, p 28
 Christopher Paudiß, p 42
 Jürgen Ovens, p 43
 Franz Wulfhagen, p 43
 Pieter Moninckx, p 44
 Jan van de Velde, p 44
 Esaias van de Velde, p 45
 Emanuel de Witte, p 45
 Jan Lievens, p 50
 Pieter van der Willigen, p 50
 Ferdinand Bol, p 54
 Palamedes Palamedesz. (I), p 56
 Anna Maria van Schurman, p 57
 Adriaen Brouwer, p 62
 Joos van Craesbeeck, p 78
 Jacob Adriaensz Backer, p 80
 Bartram de Fouchier, p 82
 Herman Saftleven, p 83
 Cornelis Saftleven, p 86
 Salomon Koninck, p 87
 Jan Baptist van Heil, p 88
 Robert van den Hoecke, p 88
 David Teniers the Younger, p 89
 Adriaen van Ostade, p 91
 Isaac van Ostade, p 91
 Cornelis Pietersz Bega, p 92
 Leendert van der Cooghen, p 93
 Willem van de Velde the Elder, p 99
 Johannes Mytens, p 100
 Thomas Willeboirts Bosschaert, p 101
 Jan Dirksz Both, p 101
 Philips Augustijn Immenraet, p 101
 Pieter Jansz (1612-1672), p 101
 Thomas Willeboirts Bosschaert, p 101
 Otto Marseus van Schrieck, p 102
 Pieter van Laer, p 104
 Pieter van Laer, p 104
 Nicolaes de Helt Stockade, p 109
 Abraham Willaerts, p 110
 Jacques d'Arthois, p 111
 Gerrit Dou, p 113
 Claes Jacobsz van der Heck, p 120
 Bartholomeus van der Helst, p 121
 Jan Albertsz Rotius, p 123
 Bonaventura Peeters, p 124
 Jacob Rotius, p 124
 David Ryckaert III, p 125
 Matthias Jansz van den Bergh, p 126
 Jan Wyck, p 127
 Thomas Wijck, p 127
 Govert Flinck, p 128
 Pieter Pietersz Nedek, p 136
 Nicolaes Latombe, p 136
 Hans IV Jordaens, p 137
 Gillis Schagen, p 137
 Ludolf Leendertsz de Jongh, p 139
 Gonzales Coques, p 141
 Pieter de Hooch, p 141
 Peter Lely, p 142
 Peter Lely, p 142
 Juriaen Jacobsze, p 148
 Pieter Meert, p 149
 Antonie Waterloo, p 149
 Jan Philips van Thielen, p 151
 Jan Philips van Thielen, p 151
 Philip de Koninck, p 153
 Carel van Savoyen, p 153
 Jacob Willemsz Delff the Younger, p 154
 Zacharias Paulusz, p 154
 Jan Baptist van Deynum, p 156
 Adriaen Verdoel, p 156
 Philips Wouwerman, p 157
 Jan Baptist Weenix, p 163
 David Beck, p 170
 Alexander Cooper, p 173
 Hendrik Martenszoon Sorgh, p 173
 Jan Ariens Duif, p 174
 Aert van Waes, p 174
 Jacob Block, p 175
 Dirk Meerkerk, p 175
 Jan Donker, p 176
 Pieter Donker, p 176
 Caesar van Everdingen, p 177
 Allaert van Everdingen, p 178
 Jan van Everdingen, p 178
 Adam Pynacker, p 180
 Cornelis de Man, p 182
 Gerbrand van den Eeckhout, p 183
 Emanuel Murant, p 185
 Joris van Son, p 185
 Wallerant Vaillant, p 186
 Bernard Vaillant, p 188
 Jan Vaillant, p 188
 Jacob van der Does, p 189
 Jacques Vaillant (painter), p 189
 Dirck Helmbreker, p 193
 Nicolaes Pieterszoon Berchem, p 194
 Andries Both, p 198
 Pieter de Grebber, p 200
 Hendrik Gerritsz Pot, p 200
 Johannes Cornelisz Verspronck, p 200
 Floris van Dyck, p 201
 Cornelis Claesz van Wieringen, p 201
 Paulus Potter, p 202
 Hercules Seghers, p 206
 Jan van Kessel, senior, p 208
 Jan Peeters I, p 210
 Pieter Boel, p 211
 Gaspar van Eyck, p 213
 Jan van den Hecke, p 213
 Nicolaas van Eyck, p 214
 Philip Fruytiers, p 214
 Jan Siberechts, p 214
 Jan Fyt, p 215
 Anton Goubau, p 215
 Frans de Neve, p 215
 Alexander Adriaenssen, p 216
 Pieter Thijs, p 216
 Peeter vander Borght, p 217
 Karel Škréta, p 217
 Frans Ykens, p 217
 Johannes Ykens, p 217
 Gabriël van der Hofstadt, p 218
 Gysbrecht Thys, p 218
 Peter de Witte III, p 218
 Willem Gabron, p 219
 Johannes Lingelbach, p 219
 Nicolas-Pierre Loir, p 219
 Artus Wolffort, p 219
 Willem van Drielenburg, p 227
 Jan Worst, p 227
 Jacob Levecq, p 228
 Samuel Dirksz van Hoogstraten, p 230
 Jan van Hoogstraten, p 236
 Walther Damery, p 239
 Jan van Ossenbeeck, p 239
 Matthias Withoos, p 240
 Alida Withoos, p 242
 Johannes Withoos, p 242
 Pieter Withoos, p 242
 Hendrik Graauw, p 243
 Frans Withoos, p 243
 Pieter Gerritsz van Roestraten, p 244
 Hendrik Verschuring, p 246
 Willem Verschuring, p 250
 Jacob van der Ulft, p 251
 Jan Theunisz Blanckerhoff, p 253
 Jan Theunisz Blanckerhoff, p 253
 Barend Graat, p 254
 Vincent van der Vinne, p 260
 Maria van Oosterwijck, p 262
 Willem Kalf, p 265
 Cornelis Bisschop, p 268
 Jacobus Bisschop, p 270
 Abraham Busschop, p 271
 Pieter van Bredael, p 271
 Peter Wolfgang van Ceulen, p 272
 Gerard van Zyl, p 274
 Willem Doudijns, p 276
 Adriaen van der Cabel, p 277
 Jan van Assen, p 279
 Ludolf Bakhuizen, p 279
 Benjamin Block, p 287
 Christoffel Pierson, p 288
 Katharina Rozee, p 291
 Willem Schellinks, p 293
 Nicolaes Maes, p 294
 Johann Heinrich Roos, p 298
 Theodor Roos, p 299
 Philipp Peter Roos, p 301
 Johann Melchior Roos, p 310
 Juriaen van Streeck, p 311
 Charles Emmanuel Biset, p 312
 Pieter Spierinckx, p 323
 Ottmar Elliger, p 327
 Jan de Baen, p 328
 Willem van de Velde the Elder, p 330
 Frederik de Moucheron, p 332
 Pieter Gallis, p 333
 Adam Frans van der Meulen, p 334
 Cornelis Kick, p 337
 Dirck Bleker, p 338
 Cornelis Brisé, p 338
 Frans Post, p 339
 Pieter Fris, p 340
 Johan van Nes, p 340
 Frans van Mieris the Elder, p 341
 Jan Steen, p 347
 Jan Linsen, p 366
 Gerard ter Borch, p 367
 Gabriël Metsu, p 372
 Johannes Spilberg, p 373
 Jan Hackaert, p 375
 Pieter van Anraedt, p 376
 Peeter Gijsels, p 377
 Karel Dujardin, p 378
 Rombout van Troyen, p 378
 Willem Drost, p 382
 Jacob Gillig, p 382
 Drost van Terlee, p 382
 Jasper Broers, p 383
 Joannes Philippus Spalthoven, p 383
 Jan Asselijn, p 384
 Jan Asselijn, p 384
 Jacob Isaakszoon van Ruisdael, p 384
 Ludowyk Smits, p 385
 Gillis d'Hondecoeter, p 387
 Melchior d'Hondecoeter, p 387
 Heiman Dullaart, p 389
 Jan van Neck, p 389
 Jan van der Heyden, p 391
 Abraham Mignon, p 392
 Adriaen van de Velde, p 395
 Abraham Genoels, p 397
 Jan van Pee, p 400
 Gerard de Lairesse, p 405

Volume III
The engraved portraits included as illustrations in Volume III are below, including one of the "Vignets", an engraving after a butterfly by Maria Sibylle Merian. The engravings are followed by the artists listed in order of appearance in the text. The portrait illustrations are all copied from Houbraken.

 Pieter Cornelisz van Slingelandt, p 1
 Barend Appelman, p 3
 Ary de Vois, p 3
 Francisque Millet, p 4
 Jacob Toorenvliet, p 4
 Johannes van Haensbergen, p 6
 Isaac Paling, p 6
 Eglon van der Neer, p 8
 Godfried Schalcken, p 11
 Govert van der Leeuw, p 17
 Abraham van Calraet, p 20
 Pieter van der Leeuw, p 20
 Morten Steenwinkel, p 20
 Hendrik van Steenwijk II, p 21
 Pieter de Molijn, p 23
 Dirck Ferreris, p 24
 Adriaen Backer, p 26
 Horatius Paulijn, p 26
 Pieter Verhoek, p 27
 Gerrit Adriaenszoon Berckheyde, p 28
 Job Adriaenszoon Berckheyde, p 28
 Johannes Vorstermans, p 32
 Jan Soukens, p 36
 Francisque Millet, p 37
 Joris van der Haagen, p 39
 Aert de Gelder, p 41
 Jean Baptiste de Champaigne, p 45
 Albert Meijeringh, p 45
 Michiel van Musscher, p 46
 Jan de Bisschop, p 47
 Ary Huybertsz Verveer, p 48
 Jan van der Lijs, p 49
 Arnold Verbius, p 49
 Israel Covyn, p 54
 Reynier Covyn, p 54
 Hubert van Ravesteyn, p 54
 Johannes Glauber, p 55
 Johannes Gottlieb Glauber, p 57
 Maria Sibylla Merian, p 58
 Johannes Voorhout, p 61
 Jacob Denys, p 62
 Matthijs Naiveu, p 62
 David van der Plas, p 63
 Daniel Seiter, p 65
 Godfrey Kneller, p 67
 Geertgen Wyntges, p 85
 Jacob van der Roer van Dordrecht, p 88
 Adriaen Backer, p 89
 Gerard Hoet, p 90
 Johannes van Bronckhorst, p 94
 Abraham Diepraam, p 96
 Matthijs Wulfraet, p 102
 Huchtenburg, p 104
 Jacob Moelaert, p 108
 Jan Luyken, p 109
 Romeyn de Hooghe, p 114
 Jan van Nickelen, p 118
 Augustinus Terwesten, p 120
 Jan Verkolje, p 125
 Nikolaas Verkolje, p 128
 Jacob Koninck, p 132
 Johannes van der Bent, p 133
 Joost Cornelisz Droochsloot, p 133
 Pieter Jansz van Ruyven, p 134
 Mattheus Wijtmans, p 134
 Aert Jansz Marienhof, p 135
 Jan Vermeer van Utrecht, p 136
 Barent van Kalraet, p 137
 Dirk van Delen, p 138
 Rochus van Veen, p 138
 Abraham de Heusch, p 139
 Pieter van der Leeuw, p 139
 Johan Starrenberg, p 140
 Jacob de Wolf, p 140
 Joanna Koerten, p 142
 Joanna Koerten, p 142
 Willem van Ingen, p 153
 Nicolaes de Vree, p 156
 Abraham Hondius, p 157
 Francoys Dancx, p 159
 Jan van Oolen, p 159
 David Colijns, p 160
 Abraham Storck, p 160
 Barent Gael, p 161
 Pieter van der Hulst, p 162
 Isaac Koene, p 162
 Pieter Peutemans, p 163
 Cornelis Holsteyn, p 165
 Hendrik Rietschoof, p 165
 Jan Claesz Rietschoof, p 165
 Simon van der Does, p 166
 Jacob van der Does, p 168
 Krzysztof Lubieniecki, p 169
 Teodor Lubieniecki, p 169
 Jan Hoogsaat, p 175
 Johannes Vollevens, p 177
 Carel Fabritius, p 178
 Jan van Bunnik, p 179
 Jan Frans van Douven, p 182
 Simon Germyn, p 187
 Wilhelmus Beurs, p 188
 John Closterman, p 189
 Jan Griffier, p 191
 Cornelis Huysmans, p 195
 Willem Wissing, p 196
 Willem de Heusch, p 197
 Dirk Maas, p 197
 Jacob de Heusch, p 198
 Philip Tideman, p 201
 Ernst Stuven, p 204
 Elias van den Broeck, p 211
 Laurens van der Vinne, p 212
 Pauwels van Hillegaert, p 213
 Pieter de Ruelles, p 213
 Pieter Andreas Rijsbrack, p 214
 Jacob van Campen, p 217
 Pieter Verbrugghen I, p 220
 Hendrik Carré, p 228
 Bernardus van Schijndel, p 228
 Richard Brakenburgh, p 229
 Dirk Dalens, p 229
 Pieter de Bailliu, p 230
 Michiel Maddersteg, p 231
 Gerard van Opstal, p 231
 Justus van Huysum, p 233
 Nicolaes van Verendael, p 234
 Jean Baptiste Morel, p 237
 Jan Baptist de Crepu, p 239
 Simon Hardimé, p 245
 Simon Pietersz Verelst, p 248
 Maria Verelst, p 253
 Nicolas van Schoor, p 255
 Gerard Edema, p 256
 Dirck van der Bergen, p 258
 Ludowyk Smits, p 259
 Isac Vromans, p 260
 Arnold Verbius, p 265
 Cornelis Verelst, p 272
 Jacob Sucquet, p 278
 Dirk Maas, p 280
 Jan Frans van Son, p 282
 Bernard Salomon, p 283
 Dirk Dalens, p 285
 Ferdinand van Kessel, p 291
 Frans Ykens, p 304
 Nicolaes Lachtropius, p 309
 Erasmus Quellinus II, p 310
 Andries Pauli, p 314
 Johan Teyler, p 327
 Jan-Erasmus Quellinus, p 331
 Simon Du Bois, p 332
 Eduard Dubois, p 332
 Gysbert Andriesz Verbrugge, p 335
 Nicolas-Pierre Loir, p 336
 Hendrik Herregouts, p 337
 Johannes Bosschaert, p 339
 Adriaen Frans Boudewyns, p 341
 Pieter Bout, p 345
 Jan Janssens, p 346
 Jacob Leyssens, p 347
 Scheffers, p 351
 Jacob van den Bosch, p 355
 Jan Josef Horemans (I), p 358
 David de Haen, p 359
 Pieter Thijs, p 361
 Hendrik van der Straaten, p 365
 Pieter Thijs, p 366
 Jan Andreas Biset, p 367
 Jan Pauwel Gillemans the Elder, p 375
 Jan van Kessel, senior, p 379
 Cornelis van de Velde, p 386
 Cornelis de Heem, p 387
 Willem van Mieris, p 387
 Frans van Mieris the Elder, p 392
 Palamedes Palamedesz II, p 395
 Albert van Spiers, p 402
 Balthasar Denner, p 408
 Bartram de Fouchier, p 409

Volume IV
Volume IV is split into two parts. After a long introduction mentioning several artists and ending with Francisque Millet, a list of painters follows beginning with Adriaen Hanneman, who took lessons at the Hague Academy and were members of the Confrerie Pictura. At the end of the Hague list, the book continues with new page numbering.

 Nicolas Poussin, p 8
 Carlo Maratta, p 8
 Augustinus Terwesten, p 8
 Mattheus Terwesten, p 8
 Charles Le Brun, p 8
 Peter Paul Rubens, p 10
 Anthony van Dyck, p 10
 Annibale Carracci, p 10
 Raphael, p 12
 Abraham Bloemaert, p 12
 Michelangelo, p 12
 Raphael, p 12
 Titian, p 12
 Antonio da Correggio, p 12
 Leonardo da Vinci, p 12
 Edward Francis Cunningham, p 19
 Nicolas van der Schoor, p 19
 Hans IV Jordaens, p 19
 Francisque Millet, p 26
 Adriaen Hanneman, p 38
 Jacob van der Does, p 38
 Gijsbert van Lybergen, p 38
 Frederick Sonnius, p 39
 Karel Dujardin, p 39
 Pieter Cosijn, p 39
 Melchior d'Hondecoeter, p 39
 Jacob Pijll, p 40
 Johan le Ducq, p 40
 Willem Doudijns, p 41
 Nicolaes Willingh, p 41
 Otto Hoynck, p 41
 Bartholomeus Meyburgh, p 41
 Jan Lievens, p 42
 Johan Bets, p 43
 Reinier de la Haye, p 43
 Caspar Netscher, p 43
 Willem Trouweelst, p 43
 François van Zandwijk, p 44
 Carel Codde, p 44
 Herman Verelst, p 44
 Simon Pietersz Verelst, p 44
 Christiaen Jansz. Dusart, p 45
 Marcus de Bye, p 45
 Jeronymus van Diest, p 46
 A. De Smet, p 46
 Isaac van Duynen, p 46
 Abraham Ragenau, p 46
 H van de Venne, p 46
 Theodor van der Schuer, p 46
 Martin Mijtens, p 47
 Isaac Mijtens, p 47
 Samuel Dirksz van Hoogstraten, p 47
 Rembrandt, p 48
 Gijsbert de Bije, p 48
 Johannes van Haensbergen, p 48
 Daniël Haringh, p 49
 Jacques Vaillant, p 50
 Nicolaes Lissant, p 50
 Daniel Mijtens the Younger, p 51
 Johannes Vollevens, p 51
 Louis Michiel, p 52
 Petro Rijs, p 53
 Simon Ruys, p 53
 Mathäus Meele, p 53
 Pieter van der Hulst, p 53
 Simon van der Does, p 54
 Jan Tilius, p 56
 Robbert Duval (1639–1732), p 57
 Wijnand Brand, p 57
 Abraham Begeyn, p 58
 Johannes Christoph Lotyn, p 59
 Constantijn Netscher, p 59
 Ezaias Terwesten, p 60
 Frans Beeldemaker, p 61
 Pierre Bourguignon, p 62
 Jacob Denys II, p 62
 Jan Hendrik Brandon, p 63
 Cornelis de Bruijn, p 63
 Hendrik Carré, p 66
 Richard van Bleeck, p 66
 Abraham van Hoogstraten, p 63
 Hendrik Carré II, p 66
 Coenraet Roepel, p 67 
 Jan Brouwer (printmaker), p 67 
 Carel Borchaert Voet, p 67 
 Jacques Parmentier, p 67 
 Nicolaes Hooft, p 68
 Pieter Hardimé, p 68
 Matthijs Pool, p 69
 Rachel Ruysch, p 69
 Adriaen van der Werff, p 70
 Hendrik van Limborch, p 70
 Dirk Kint, p 71
 Arnold Verbius, p 71
 Gaspar Peeter Verbruggen the Younger, p 72
 Jan van Gool, p 73
 Louis de Moni, p 75
 Willem Johan van Haensbergen, p 75
 Johannes van Haensbergen, p 75
 Johannes Vollevens II, p 75
 Gerard Hoet, p 75
 Jacob Schalcken, p 79
 Pellegrino Aretusi, p 79
 Philip van Dijk, p 82
 Jan Serin, p 82
 Huchtenburg, p 83
 Antonie de Waard, p 84
 Girolamo da Carpi, p 85
 Leonard François Louis, p 85
 Daniel Marot, p 85
 Pieter van Bredael, p 87
 Jacques Ignatius de Roore, p 87
 Abraham Carré, p 87
 Hendrik Carré II, p 87
 Mattheus Verheyden, p 87
 Peter van Call (II), p 88
 Johan Hendrik Keller, p 88
 Hermanus Wolters, p 89
 Theodor van Pee, p 89
 Jan Jacob Nachenius, p 89
 Balthasar Denner, p 89
 Herman Cuipers, p 92

Volume IV part two

 Carel de Moor, p 1
 Jan Laroon, p 28
 Marcellus Laroon, p 31
 Peter Casteels II, p 33
 Pieter Casteels III, p 35
 Arnold Frans Rubens, p 36
 Jan Claudius de Cock, p 47
 Michiel Carree, p 54
 Jan van Helmont, p 56
 Richard Collin, p 57
 Zeger Jacob van Helmont, p 58
 Richard van Orly, p 61
 Adriaen van der Werff, p 68
 Jan Pieter Eykens, p 87
 Jan Griffier, p 91
 Robert Griffier, p 92
 Bartram de Fouchier, p 98
 Pieter van Bredael, p 103
 Jacob de Wit, p 104
 Cornelis Troost, p 107
 Carel Borchaert Voet, p 111
 Nicolaas van Eyck, p 114
 Coenraet Roepel, p 121 
 Gerard Melder, p 123
 Caspar Netscher, p 124
 Theodorus Netscher, p 140
 Constantijn Netscher, p 148
 Theodor van der Schuer, p 153
 Mattheus Terwesten, p 158
 Augustinus Terwesten, p 181
 Pieter Terwesten, p 182
 Jan Verbruggen, p 183
 Jan van Gool, p 186
 Hendrick Danckerts, p 200
 Willem Wissing, p 201
 John Hoskins (painter), p 208
 Prosper Henricus Lankrink, p 211
 John Greenhill, p 219
 Cornelis Huysmans, p 221
 Abraham Cooper, p 223
 Remigius van Leemput, p 224
 Alexander Cooper, p 228
 Jacques Stella, p 229
 Adriaen Hanneman, p 247
 Ludowyk Smits, p 251
 Richard van Bleeck, p 254
 Pieter Gerritsz van Roestraten, p 260
 Jan Siberechts, p 263
 Nicholas Hilliard, p 265
 Wenceslaus Hollar, p 268
 Willem de Keyser, p 271
 Pieter van Mol, p 290
 Jan Miel, p 291
 Bartholomeus Breenbergh, p 293
 William Dobson, p 294
 Frederick Kerseboom or Causabon, p 299
 A Carlisle, p 302
 Adam Colonia, p 303
 Hendrik Colonia, p 304
 Jan de Beijer, p 306
 John Baptist Gaspars, p 314
 George Lambert (English painter), p 316
 Jan Looten, p 318
 Gerard Edema, p 321
 Nicolaes Willingh, p 324
 Cornelis Janssens van Ceulen, p 326
 Aleijda Wolfsen, p 326
 Jan Soest, p 329
 John Riley (painter), p 330
 Pieter Nason, p 333
 Carel Codde, p 335
 Jan van der Heyden, p 339
 Pieter Hermansz Verelst, p 340
 Johann Zacharias Kneller, p 342
 Egbert van Heemskerck, p 345
 Louis Ferdinand Elle the Younger, p 357
 Herman van der Mijn, p 359
 Leonard François Louis, p 363
 Pieter Hardimé, p 375
 Gerard Wigmana, p 375
 Frank Pieterse Verheyden, p 380
 Jacques Ignatius de Roore, p 384
 Dirk Kint, p 389
 Mathäus Meele, p 390
 Cornelis Beeldemaker, p 405
 Jacob Campo Weyerman, p 409
 Henriëtta van Pee, p 432

References
 De levens-beschryvingen der Nederlandsche konst-schilders en konst-schilderessen, door Jakob Campo Weyerman, Konst-schider.

External links

1729 books
1769 books
Dutch biographies
Weyerman
Dutch biographical dictionaries